Santo ('saint' in various languages) may refer to:

People
 Santo (given name)
 Santo (surname)
 El Santo, Rodolfo Guzmán Huerta (1917–1984), Mexican wrestler and actor
 Bob Santo or Santo, stage name of Ghanaian comedian John Evans Kwadwo Bosompem (1940-2002)
 Ferdinand III of Castile (1200–1252) called "el Santo" ("the Saint")

Places
Santo, Ouest, Haiti, a village
Santō, Shiga, Japan, a town
Santo, Texas, United States, an unincorporated community
Basilica of Saint Anthony of Padua, Italy, known locally as il Santo
Espiritu Santo, the largest island of Vanuatu, nicknamed Santo
Luganville, known locally as Santo

Arts and entertainment
Santo (art), a wooden or ivory statue depicting a holy figure
Santo (EP), by Alonso Brito, 2008
"Santo" (song), by Christina Aguilera, 2022
"Santo", a song by Ely Buendia
Il Santo (novel), Antonio Fogazzaro, 1905

See also 

Los Santos (disambiguation)
Santos (disambiguation)
Santa (disambiguation)
Sao (disambiguation)
Espírito Santo (disambiguation)
Espiritu Santo (disambiguation)